Al-Sumoud Sport Club, is an Iraqi football team based in Falluja, Al-Anbar, that plays in Iraq Division Three.

Managerial history
 Saadi Awwad 
 Mohammed Khalil
 Mustafa Mahmoud

See also 
 2002–03 Iraq FA Cup
 2020–21 Iraq FA Cup

References

External links
 Al-Sumoud SC on Goalzz.com
 Iraq Clubs- Foundation Dates

1992 establishments in Iraq
Association football clubs established in 1992
Football clubs in Al-Anbar